Daal Mein Kala is an Indian television comedy series, aired on Star Plus in 1998.

Plot
Ram Sinha owns a restaurant in which women are not allowed. Ram is a women hater and he also wants his brothers Lakhan, Bharat and Shatrughan to also hate and avoid women, but the brothers don't think the same way as Ram does think. So, whenever Ram is not around them, they try to do something for fun, which turns out to be disaster and creates a hilarious situation.

Cast
Navin Nischol as Ram Sinha 
Dharampal as Lakhan Sinha
Dilip Joshi as Bharat Sinha
Rakesh Thareja/Ronak Kotecha as Shatrughan Sinha
Sharad Sankala as Chardutt Yalgaonkar a.k.a. Chai
Kishore Bhanushali as Coffee
Smita Jaikar as Kiran (Ram's love interest)
Smita Bansal as Julie (Lakhan and Shatrughan love interest, but is in love with Shatrughan)
Renuka Shahane as Princess (Bharat's love interest)
Shammiji as Madonna mausi 
Farida Jalal (Special appearance)
Paintal as Various Characters

References

Indian television series